Simon Davies is a British privacy advocate and academic from Australia, formerly based in London, UK. Davies was one of the first campaigners in the field of international privacy advocacy, founding the watchdog organisation Privacy International in 1990 and subsequently working in emerging areas of privacy such as electronic visual surveillance, identity systems, border security, encryption policy and biometrics.

In July 2008 Davies criticised the Stranton landmark Viacom vs. Google & YouTube ruling, stating the privacy of millions of YouTube users was threatened: 'The chickens have come home to roost for Google. Their arrogance and refusal to listen to friendly advice has resulted in the privacy of tens of millions being placed under threat. Governments and organisations are realising that companies like Google have a warehouse full of data. And while that data is stored it is under threat of being used and putting privacy in danger.' Davies was also listed as current chief executive officer of UK consultancy group 80/20 Thinking Limited, which is defunct as of June 2015.

In 2022, Davies was convicted of child sex offences committed in Sydney in the 1980s, having been wanted by police in New South Wales since 2016.

Academic posts
Davies has been a visiting fellow in law at both the University of Greenwich and the University of Essex. He has also been a visiting senior fellow within the Department of Management of the London School of Economics (LSE). He is also codirector of the LSE's Policy Engagement Network which is presently researching options for the process stage of the development of a new British constitution. In 2014, he has been a visiting professor at John Cabot University, an American university in Rome, Italy.

Awards
In April 1999 Davies received the Electronic Frontier Foundation's Pioneer Award for his contribution to online freedom. In 2007 was made a fellow of the British Computer Society. In both 2004 and 2005 silicon.com voted him as one of the world's 50 most influential people in technology policy.

Arrest
In December 2019, based on accounts of survivors in Australia and a September 2016 New South Wales arrest warrant, an international police alert was issued  to locate Davies in relation to allegations of child sexual abuse during the 1980s, when he had been chief executive of the Homeless Children's Association in Darlinghurst in Sydney. Davies gave himself up to police in The Hague, and was subsequently held by Dutch police pending extradition. He was extradited in April 2021 and charged by the New South Wales police with 'numerous' historical counts of abuse; he was subsequently convicted, with sentencing hearings in late 2022.

References

External links
 The Privacy Surgeon - website described as Simon Davies' brain space

Living people
Year of birth missing (living people)
Privacy activists
Fellows of the British Computer Society
Human rights in the United Kingdom
Australian people convicted of child sexual abuse
British people convicted of child sexual abuse
Australian people convicted of indecent assault
British people convicted of indecent assault